Stigmella alaternella is a moth of the family Nepticulidae. It is found in France, the Iberian Peninsula and Italy.

The larvae feed on Rhamnus alaternus. They mine the leaves of their host plant. The mine consists of a full depth, not very slender corridor, not associated with the leaf margin, widening into a very large blotch.

External links
bladmineerders.nl
Fauna Europaea

Nepticulidae
Moths of Europe
Moths described in 1937